Exmouth Town Football Club is a football club based in Exmouth, Devon, England.

History
The club was established in 1933. They entered the Premier Division of the Exeter & District League in 1948, and were runners-up in 1949–50. The following season saw them win both the Devon Senior Cup and the East Devon Senior Cup in 1950–51. They were relegated after finishing bottom of the Premier Division in 1957–58, but returned to the division in 1961. The club finished as Premier Division runners-up in 1968–69 and won the Devon Premier Cup in 1970–71. After finishing as runners-up again in 1971–72, they joined the Western League in 1973. They finished bottom of the league in 1974–75 and again the following season, resulting in relegation to the newly-formed Division One.

The 1979–80 season saw Exmouth win the Devon Premier Cup for a second time. The club remained in Division One until finishing as runners-up in 1981–82, earning promotion to the Premier Division. After finishing sixteenth in their first season in the Premier Division, they were league champions in 1983–84 and again in 1985–86. Exmouth went on to finish as Premier Division runners-up in 1986–87 and again in 1988–89, a season in which they also won the Les Phillips Cup. However, a decline thereafter saw them relegated to Division One at the end of the 1993–94 season. In 2002–03 they finished as runners-up in Division One, earning promotion back to the Premier Division. However, they withdrew from the league midway through the 2005–06 season due to financial problems, with the reserve team in the Devon & Exeter League becoming the new first team.

Exmouth's first season back in the Devon & Exeter League saw them finish third, after which they became founder members of the new South West Peninsula League, earning a place in Division One East. They won the division in 2012–13 and were promoted to the Premier Division; the season also saw them win the Devon Premier Cup for a third time. In the following season they finished as Premier Division runners-up. The club were promoted to Southern League Division One South and West after finishing as Premier Division runners-up in the 2021–22 season.

Season-by-season

Ground
The club initially played at the Maer Cricket Field, before moving to the King George V Ground on Southern Road in 1964. Floodlights were installed in the 1980s and the ground's record attendance of 2,395 was set for a friendly match against Liverpool on 28 July 1987. A new 50-seat stand was installed in 2016.

Honours
Western League
Premier Division champions 1983–84, 1985–86
Les Phillips Cup winners 1988–89
South West Peninsula League
Division One East champions 2012–13
Devon Senior Cup
Winners 1950–51
Devon St Lukes Challenge Cup
Winners 1984–85, 1988–89, 1989–90
Devon Premier Cup
Winners 1970–71, 1979–80, 2012–13
East Devon Senior Cup
Winners 1950–51, 1982–83
Morrison Bell Cup 
Winners 1933–34, 1937–38, 1956–57, 1970–71, 1982–83, 1989–90, 2003–04, 2004–05

Records
Best FA Cup performance: Fourth qualifying round, 1988–89, 1989–90
Best FA Trophy performance: Preliminary round, 1974–75
Best FA Vase performance: Semi-finals, 1984–85
Record attendance: 2,395 vs Liverpool, friendly match, 28 July 1987

See also
Exmouth Town F.C. players
Exmouth Town F.C. managers

References

External links
Official website

 
Football clubs in England
Football clubs in Devon
Association football clubs established in 1933
1933 establishments in England
Exmouth
Devon and Exeter Football League
Western Football League
South West Peninsula League